Oheneba Nana Ama Dokua Asiamah-Adjei (born 24 July 1982) is a Ghanaian politician and the member of parliament for Akropong Constituency in the Eastern region of Ghana. She is a member of the New Patriotic Party who is currently the Ghanaian deputy minister of Trade & Industry. She was formerly Deputy Minister of Information.

Early life and education
Adjei was born on 24 July 1982 to Nana Osae Nyampong IV and Mrs. Aforo Asiamah-Adjei in Akropong, Eastern Region. She had her basic and senior school education at Alsyd Academy and St Roses Senior High school respectively. She holds a bachelor's degree in psychology from the University of Ghana and a master's degree in Logistics and Supply Chain from the Exter University in United Kingdom She further had her master's degree in Peace and Security at the Kofi Annan International Peacekeeping Training Centre (KAIPTC).

Career 
Adjei was the managing director for Bekleen Limited from 2007 to 2016 and also Pongas Limited from 2007 to 2015.

Politics 
Adjei is a member of the New Patriotic Party. She is currently the Member of Parliament for the Akropong Constituency in the Eastern Region of Ghana.

2016 election 
In the 2016 Ghanaian general election, she won the Akropong/Akuapem North Constituency parliamentary seat with 26,655 votes making 62.3% of the total votes cast whilst the NDC parliamentary candidate Yaw Appiah-Kubi had 6,949 votes making 16.8% of the total votes cast, an Independent parliamentary candidate Asiedu Ofei had 9,092 votes making 21.2% of the total votes cast and the CPP parliamentary candidate Gifty Mercy Anakwa had 102 votes making 0.2% of the total votes cast.

2020 election 
In the 2020 Ghanaian general election, she again won the Akropong/Akuapem North Constituency parliamentary seat with 26,646 votes making 55.3% of the total votes cast whilst the NDC parliamentary candidate Justice Kotey Amasah had 10,505 votes making 21.8% of the total votes cast, an Independent parliamentary candidate Adjei Twumasi William Kwabena had 10,444 votes making 21.7% of the total votes cast, the PNC parliamentary candidate Desmond Twumasi Ntow had 421 votes making 0.9% of the total votes cast and the CPP parliamentary candidate Gifty Mercy Anakwa had 146 votes making 0.3% of the total votes cast.

Committee 
Adjei is a member of the Defence and Interior Committee.

Personal life
Adjei is married to Charles Cromwell Nanabanyin Bissue and they have a son and two daughters. She identifies as a Christian.

Philanthropy 
In November 2021, she presented computers and accessories to Mangoase Methodist School in the Akuapim North Constituency.

In May 2022, Adjei donated an amount of GHc30,000 for the construction of the chief palace at Adawso. In July 2022, she aided in the refurbishment of the Akropong Daakye Clinic.

References

Living people
1982 births
21st-century Ghanaian women politicians
New Patriotic Party politicians
Alumni of St Roses Senior High school (Akwatia)
Ghanaian MPs 2017–2021
University of Ghana alumni
Alumni of the University of Exeter
People from Eastern Region (Ghana)
Ghanaian MPs 2021–2025